Bhadri is a village of Pratapgarh district in the Indian state of Uttar Pradesh.

Demographics 
 latest census, Bhadri has a population of 2985 divided into 563 families. Male population is 1458 and that of female is 1527. Bhadri has an average literacy rate of 66.23 percent, almost same as state average of 67.68 percent, male literacy is 82.24 percent, and female literacy is 51.59 percent. In Bhadri, 13.50 percent of the population is under 6 years of age.

Work Profile
Out of the total population, 972 are engaged in work or business activity.31.38 percent of workers describe their work as main work, 36 are cultivators while 63 are agricultural labourers.

References

Villages in Pratapgarh district, Uttar Pradesh